Health and Hospital Corporation of Marion County v. Talevski (Docket 21–806) is a pending United States Supreme Court case related to private enforcement of Spending Clause statutes. It relates to whether third parties can initiate lawsuits against public institutions for violations of Congressional spending bills under claims of Section 1983, which was established to protect individual rights from constitutional violations from public institutions.

Background 

Gorgi Talevski suffered from dementia and his family placed him in a nursing home operated by the Health and Hospital Corporation of Marion County (HHC). As Talevski's condition declined, HHC transferred him between various facilities, and modified his course of medication. Talevski's family objected to these changes, and eventually sued under Section 1983 of the Ku Klux Klan Act (codified at ) to enforce the Federal Nursing Home Amendments Act of 1987 (FNHRA) against HHC. Talevski asserted he could enforce the FNHRA, which specifies conditions for facilities to receive federal Medicaid funding, against HHC, because it confers federal rights that Section 1983 provides a venue to vindicate; the Supreme Court has generally upheld that private citizens can sue under Section 1983, including for Medicare programs, if the government had deprived them of "any rights, privileges, or immunities secured by the Constitution and laws" as recently as Edelman v. Jordan (1974). The United States District Court for the Northern District of Indiana disagreed and dismissed his complaint, but the United States Court of Appeals for the Seventh Circuit reversed.

HHC filed a petition for a writ of certiorari, asserting a conflict with cases like Gonzaga University v. Doe and Blessing v. Freestone.

Supreme Court 

Certiorari was granted in the case on May 2, 2022. Amici briefs on in support of HHC were submitted by the National Conference of State Legislatures and the American Healthcare Association. Amici in support of Talevski were submitted by Public Citizen, the Constitutional Accountability Center, and the AARP. The case was argued on November 8, 2022.

References

External links 
 

2023 in United States case law
United States Supreme Court cases
United States Supreme Court cases of the Roberts Court
Second Enforcement Act of 1871 case law